The Heinkel He 115 was a three-seat World War II Luftwaffe seaplane. It was used as a torpedo bomber and performed general seaplane duties, such as reconnaissance and minelaying. The aircraft was powered by two 960 PS (947 hp, 720 kW) BMW 132K nine-cylinder air-cooled radial engines. Some later models could seat four, had different engines or used different weapon arrangements.

Development and design
In 1935, the German Reich Air Ministry (RLM, Reichsluftfahrtministerium) produced a requirement for a twin engined general purpose floatplane, suitable for patrol and for anti-shipping strikes with bombs and torpedoes. Proposals were received from Heinkel Flugzeugwerke and from the Blohm & Voss aircraft subsidiary Hamburger Flugzeugbau. On 1 November 1935, orders were placed with Heinkel and Hamburger Flugzeugbau for three prototypes each of their prospective designs, the He 115 and the Ha 140.

The first prototype Heinkel flew in August 1937, testing was successful and the He 115 design was selected over the Ha 140 early in 1938, leading to an order for another prototype and 10 pre-production aircraft.

Armament initially consisted of two 7.92 mm (.312 in) MG 15 machine guns, one in the nose and one in the dorsal position. Later He 115s were fitted with a fixed forward-firing 15 mm or 20 mm MG 151 cannon and two rearward-firing 7.92 mm (.312 in) MG 17 machine guns in the engine nacelles. He 115 variants carried LTF 5 or LTF 6b torpedoes and SD 500  or SC 250  bombs. Some also carried LMB III or LMA mines.

Operational history

Luftwaffe

At the outbreak of the war, the He 115 was used for dropping parachute mines in British waters, normally aiming for narrow passages close to busy ports on the English south coast; the River Thames was also a prime target.
The aircraft had its finest moment on anti-shipping operations against Arctic convoys from bases in northern Norway. Because the first convoys lacked air cover, the slow and lightly armed He 115 was less vulnerable than near the English coast. With the appearance of carriers and escort carriers, coupled with new Soviet heavy fighters like the Petlyakov Pe-3bis, Luftwaffe air superiority over the convoys was challenged and losses increased.

Apart from its use as a minelayer and torpedo bomber, the He 115 was used for coastal reconnaissance and by KG 200 to drop agents behind enemy lines.

Royal Norwegian Navy Air Service

In response to the rising tensions in Europe, the Norwegian Ministry of Defence had ordered six He 115Ns for the Royal Norwegian Navy Air Service (RNoNAS) on 28 August 1939 and the aircraft were delivered from 14 July – 13 November 1939. The He 115N order was intended to replace the RNoNAS fleet of 1920s vintage Douglas DT torpedo bombers and the obsolescent Marinens Flyvebaatfabrikk M.F.11, which was the mainstay of the RNoNAS in 1940. The Norwegians signed another order of six He 115Ns in December 1939, with delivery expected in March/April 1940 but this was forestalled by Operation Weserübung, the German invasion of Norway of 9 April 1940. At the outbreak of hostilities, the RNoNAS had six He 115Ns in service (F.50, F.52, F.54, F.56, F.58 and F.60) spread along the coast from the naval air stations at Sola and Flatøy in the south to the one at Skattøra Naval Air Station outside Tromsø in the north. At the beginning of the German invasion, the aircraft at the seaplane base at Hafrsfjord near Stavanger (F.60) was captured by the Germans, but two Luftwaffe He 115s (given the codes F.62 and F.64 in Norwegian service) were seized by an improvised militia unit of Norwegian riflemen at Ørnes in Glomfjord, Nordland and by police officers at Brønnøysund, Nordland. The two aircraft were seized after they ran out of fuel and had to make emergency landings on 10 April. Manned by Norwegian aircrews, they served against their former owners for the duration of the campaign.

Seven Norwegian He-115s, five of them He-115Ns, were employed against German and German-controlled ships (see: HNoMS Uller), as well as providing ground support to the Norwegian Army offensive on the Narvik Front. On 14 April 1940, three Norwegian He 115s made a successful attack on German Ju 52s at Gullesfjordbotn. Four of the Norwegian aircraft (F.52, F.56, F.58 and F.64) made the journey to the United Kingdom shortly before the 10 June 1940 surrender, a fifth (F.50) escaping to Finland, landing on Lake Salmijärvi in Petsamo. A sixth He 115 (F.54) also tried to make the journey to Britain but was lost over the North Sea. The last of the Norwegian He 115s, F.62 (one of the two captured German aircraft), was unserviceable at the time of the evacuation and was abandoned at Skattøra, later being repaired and flown by the Germans.

Royal Air Force

The four escaped aircraft were reformed into the Norwegian Helensburgh Group under Commander Bugge.
The exiled Norwegian Cabinet Nygaardsvold made plans soon after arriving in Britain to use the four He 115 aircraft to perform leaflet dropping missions over Norway. The leaflet mission was to deliver a declaration to the Norwegian people, stating the Norwegian authorities were re-established in the UK and rejected any Nazi German overtures for a German–Norwegian peace deal. All four Norwegian He 115s were ordered from Helensburgh to Scapa Flow on 3 July 1940 to carry out the mission, although one had to return to Helensburgh due to engine problems. The three He 115s assembled at Scapa Flow were ordered to fly to Norway and drop the declaration over the cities of Oslo, Bergen and Trondheim. Shortly before the mission was to get under way the British Air Ministry intervened and stopped the expedition, insisting that such an undertaking would be suicidal to attempt with the slow flying He 115s. Three days later, the aircraft returned to Helensburgh.

Three of the Norwegian He 115s (F.56, F.58 and F.64) were subsequently used in covert operations off Norway and in the Mediterranean Sea with Norwegian crews. In British service, the three received new serial numbers, BV184, BV185 and BV187. BV184 was attacked and damaged by two Polish Spitfire fighters over the Bay of Biscay in the spring of 1942, while co-operating with French fishing boats and later lost in a refuelling fire in the UK. BV185 was destroyed in an Italian air raid on Kalafrana, Malta after flying just one clandestine operation to North Africa. BV187 flew several missions on the North African coast from its base in Malta before being destroyed by two German Bf 109s.

Finnish Air Force

On 8 June 1940, the day after Norwegian forces were ordered to cease hostilities, one He 115 (F.50, deemed technically unfit to be flown to UK), was flown to Finland posing as a civilian aircraft LN-MAB. The float-plane was interned but the pilot, experienced line captain and naval lieutenant Helge Dahl and crew were free to leave Finland. From Summer 1941 it was used by the LLv.14 of the Finnish Air Force code HE-115 and named "Jenny", to ferry Sissi troops behind Soviet lines. In this role, it proved valuable in a terrain with numerous secluded lakes. It served in this role until ambushed in East Karelia on 4 July 1943. Jenny took off but soon had to ditch and the crew was taken prisoner. Two days later the floating HE-115 was strafed by Finnish Morane-Saulnier MS406 fighters. There are reports that the Soviets salvaged the wreck for evaluation. Two Luftwaffe He 115 C were borrowed for similar operations in 1943–44 and operated with German markings by Finnish crew. One was returned in 1944 but the other was surrendered to the Soviets after armistice.

Swedish Air Force
The Swedish Air Force operated 12 He 115A-2s under the local designation T 2, with Air Force numbers 101–112. Another six aircraft were ordered but never delivered due to the outbreak of World War II. They were sturdy and well liked by their crews and were not taken out of use until 1952. The Swedish T 2s were kept on duty throughout World War II and made a valuable contribution to protecting and enforcing Swedish neutrality. The T 2s replaced the outdated T 1s (Heinkel HD 16s) as torpedo bombers and also served as regular bombers, for smoke screening and for long-range reconnaissance missions. Five of the 12 T 2s were lost in accidents during their service with the Swedish Air Force.

Variants

Prototypes
Five prototypes were used in the development of the aircraft,
 He 115 V1 August 1937, set eight payload/speed records
 He 115 V2 November 1937, similar to V1
 He 115 V3 March 1938, introduced glassed cockpit, which became standard
 He 115 V4 May 1938, production prototype, introduced struts in place of wires between fuselage and floats
 He 115 V5 1939

Production
The basic design of the aircraft remained unchanged during the type's career. The main differences, with a few notable exceptions, were changes in armament and avionics. Also to note is that the 'new' 'E' version, launched when production restarted in 1941, is in fact similar to the 'C'-series, again with the exception of armament changes.
 He 115 A-0 10 pre-production examples, armed with a single machine gun
 He 115 A-1 added a nose-mounted machine gun.
 He 115 A-2 similar to A-1, exported to Norway and Sweden
 He 115 A-3 modified weapons bay and changes to the radio equipment
 He 115 B-0 the 'B'-series introduced the ability to trade fuel and bomb load, as well as the possibility to carry a  magnetic mine
 He 115 B-1 added increased fuel capacity
 He 115 B-1/R1
 He 115 B-1/R2
 He 115 B-1/R3
 He 115 B-2 had reinforced floats for operation from ice or snow
 He 115 C-1 introduced additional armament
 He 11 5C-1/R1
 He 115 C-1/R2
 He 115 C-1/R3
 He 115 C-1/R4
 He 115 C-2 reinforced floats in same manner as B-2
 He 115 C-3 minelayer version.
 He 115 C-4 torpedo bomber version.
 He 115 D one aircraft fitted with BMW 801C engines rated at 1,147 kW (1,560 PS) each.
 He 115 E-1 similar to the 'C'-series, but with revised armament.

Operators

 Ilmavoimat
 Germany
 Luftwaffe

 Royal Norwegian Navy Air Service

 Aviación Nacional

 Svenska flygvapnet

 Royal Air Force

Specifications (He 115 B-1)

Surviving aircraft

 He 115 A-2 Werknr. 3043? Recovered from Russia, now in storage with private owner in France
 He 115 B/C Werknr. 2398  was recovered from Hafrsfjord in Norway on 2 June 2012. It was part of 1 Staffel, Seefernaufklärungsgruppe 906 (No. 1 Squadron, 906 Maritime Reconnaissance Group), known until February 1941 as Küstenfliegergruppe 906 (906 Coastal Aviation Group), Luftflotte 5. In July 2012 the aircraft was in storage awaiting restoration at the Flyhistorisk Museum, Sola near Stavanger.
 The wreck of a He 115 was located at the bottom of the lake Limingen in Nord-Trøndelag, Norway in 2013.

See also

References

Notes

Bibliography

 
 Donald, David (ed). Warplanes of the Luftwaffe. London:Aerospace Publishing, 1994. .
 Ede, Paul and Moeng, Soph (gen. editors) The Encyclopedia of World Aircraft  
 
 Keskinen, Kalevi and Stenman, Kari Finnish Air Force 1939-1945  .
 "Last of a Genus...The Heinkel 115". Air International, February 1987, Vol. 32 No. 2. pp. 96–101. ISSN 0306-5634.
 "Last of a Genus...The Heinkel 115 Part Two". Air International, March 1987, Vol. 32 No. 3. pp. 154–156. ISSN 0306-5634.
 Munson, Kenneth. Fighters and Bombers of World War II. London: Peerage Books. 1983. 
 Norrbom, Gösta   ISBN unstated

External links

 Article on He 115 found at Haltenbanken

1930s German bomber aircraft
Floatplanes
World War II torpedo bombers of Germany
He 115
Low-wing aircraft
Aircraft first flown in 1937
Twin piston-engined tractor aircraft
World War II aircraft of Finland